"Janie Jones" is a song by the English punk rock band the Clash. It is the opening track on their debut album, The Clash (1977). The song is named after Janie Jones, a cabaret singer who organised sex parties at her Kensington home.

A live performance of "Janie Jones" is featured in the 1980 film Rude Boy, and the song has been on the soundtracks of other films as well.

The song is the first choice on narrator Rob Fleming's list of "five best side one track ones" in Nick Hornby's 1995 novel High Fidelity and on Rob Gordon's Top 5 list in the 2000 film adaptation.

Composition 
The song is named after Janie Jones, a minor English cabaret and pop singer in the 1960s who was convicted in 1974 of "controlling prostitutes" at sex parties she held at her home in Kensington. She was released from prison in 1977, and an allegedly smitten Joe Strummer composed the song in her honour.

Releases 
In addition to The Clash, the song has appeared on the compilation albums The Story of the Clash, Volume 1 (1988) (disc two), Clash on Broadway (1991) (disc one; demo version), and The Essential Clash (2003) (disc one). A live version recorded on 4 June 1981 at Bond's Casino, New York City, is featured on the bootleg Live at Bond's Casino (2000).

Personnel
 Joe Strummer - lead vocal
 Mick Jones - backing vocals, guitar
 Paul Simonon - backing vocal, bass
 Terry Chimes - drums

Use in other media
The live performance of the song at the Apollo in Glasgow on 4 July 1978, is featured in Rude Boy, a 1980 film directed by Jack Hazan and David Mingay, starring Ray Gange and the Clash. The track was re-recorded at Wessex Studios by engineer Bill Price and tape operator Jerry Green. The song was also featured on The Clash: Westway to the World, a 2000 documentary film directed by Don Letts.

Martin Scorsese, a fan of the Clash, said that he considers "Janie Jones" to be the greatest British rock and roll song. He used the song in his 1999 film Bringing Out the Dead. The song is also used in Michael Winterbottom's 2002 film 24 Hour Party People.

Janie Jones is the iconic name given a record producer's long-lost love in season two of Californication, a character played by Madchen Amick. As lead character Hank Moody, David Duchovny refers to the Clash song more than once in scenes with Amick.

Other than its title, the 2010 David M. Rosenthal film Janie Jones bears only slight similarities to the song's lyrical theme.

Cover versions
A rockabilly remake of "Janie Jones" by the Farrell Bros. is included on the various-artists tribute album This Is Rockabilly Clash, released by Raucous Records in 2002.  In 2005, The Slackers and Chris Murray covered it on their collaborative album Slackness and the folk noir trio Songdog included a version on The Time of Summer Lightning. Babyshambles released their version, with contributions from others, in 2006 to benefit Joe Strummer's charity foundation Strummerville.

Other versions include remakes by Neurotic Outsiders and by Against Me!, who performed it in August 2011 for The A.V. Clubs Undercover series. Thea Gilmore recreates the drum rhythm at the beginning of the original song in her recording of another Clash song, "I'm Not Down."  The song has also been played numerous times in concert by the English bands the Paddingtons and Bush.

Babyshambles & Friends
"Janie Jones" (sometimes "Janie Jones (Strummerville)") was released through B-Unique Records to raise money for late Joe Strummer's charity foundation Strummerville and features contributions from others bands like Dirty Pretty Things, Larrikin Love, We Are Scientists, the Kooks, and Guillemots. This release marks the first time that Carl Barât and Pete Doherty worked together since the Libertines split up, although they never met during the recording process.

Music video
The video revolves around (the real) Janie Jones being chauffeured around London with Mick Jones. Many of the contributors to the song feature in the video. Drew McConnell accompanies Janie Jones from the Windmill theatre right at the beginning as she's getting into her car, Alan Donohoe from the Rakes is driving the car, two members of Cazals are walking down the street near the start and their singer, Phil Bush, mimes 'lucky lady', the two guys standing in front of the telephone box are Josh Hubbard from The Paddingtons and one member of Guillemots; Carl Barât, Anthony Rossomando, Gary Powell and a guitar can be seen in a car pulling up to a petrol station, while Jack Peñate is also seen at the petrol station and Lisa Moorish is seen singing along towards the end. The lead singer from the Mystery Jets is seen walking with one of the Holloways on the side of the street.

 Track listing 
 CD
 "Janie Jones"
 "Janie Jones" (Pete Doherty vocal version)
 "Janie Jones" (Video)
 7"
 "Janie Jones"
 "Janie Jones" (Statik remix)

Personnel
 Pete Doherty – lead vocals
 Drew McConnell – bass and guitar
 Adam Ficek – drums
 Mick Whitnall – guitarContributors Kid Harpoon
 Carl Barât
 The Rakes
 Mystery Jets
 The Holloways
 We Are Scientists
 The Paddingtons
 Larrikin Love
 Cazals
 Noisettes
 Good Books Ladyfuzz
 The Kooks
 Jack Peñate
 Laura Marling
 The Maccabees
 Lisa Moorish
 Lightspeed Champion
 Jamie T
 Jeremy Warmsley
 GuillemotsAdditional contributors to the Statik remix'
 Lethal Bizzle
 JME
 No Mind
 Talk Taxis

Chart performance

Notes

References

Songs about musicians
Songs about prostitutes
Cultural depictions of prostitutes
Cultural depictions of British women
1977 songs
2006 singles
All-star recordings
Charity singles
Pete Doherty songs
The Clash songs
Songs written by Mick Jones (The Clash)
Songs written by Joe Strummer
B-Unique Records singles